Conrad Cummings is a professional boxer from Northern Ireland who held the WBO European middleweight title twice between 2017 and 2019.

Professional career

Early career 
Cummings made his professional debut on 22 February 2014, scoring a four-round points decision (PTS) victory over Andrejs Loginovs at the York Hall in London.

After compiling a record of 7–0 (3 KOs) he faced Alfredo Meli for the vacant Celtic middleweight title on 20 November 2015 at the Waterfront Hall in Belfast, Northern Ireland. Cummings scored a knockdown within the first minute of the fight, Meli appeared unhurt and made it back to his feet by the referee's count of three. Cummings received multiple warnings throughout the fight for low blows and pushing down on Meli's head before both fighters were deducted one point for excessive holding in the ninth round. After then ten rounds came to an end the bout was scored a split draw, with the Celtic title remaining vacant. One judge scored the bout 95–92 in favour of Cummings, the second scored it 96–93 to Meli, while the third judge scored it even at 94–94.

Following three consecutive wins, one by stoppage, Cummings faced Ronny Mittag for the vacant IBF Inter-Continental middleweight title on 18 November 2016 at the Wembley Arena in London. In what was described as a controversial decision, Cummings suffered his first professional defeat, losing by split decision over ten rounds. One judge scored the bout 96–94 in favour of Cummings while the other two scored it 96–94 to Mittag.

WBO European title 
The pair were set to face each other in an immediate rematch scheduled for 11 March 2017 at the Motorpoint Arena in Cardiff, Wales, featuring on the undercard of a British cruiserweight title fight between Craig Kennedy and Stephen Simmons. However, the fight was cancelled one week before the event after Simmons – who was a replacement for Kennedy's original opponent, Matty Askin – had pulled out of the headline bout due to suffering an injury. As a result of the cancellation, Mittag withdrew from the bout with Cummings. Days after the date of the cancelled event it was announced a new fight had been scheduled for 24 March 2017 against Gogi Knezevic for the vacant WBO European middleweight title, taking place at the Meadowbank Sports Centre in Edinburgh, Scotland. Cummings scored a knockdown in the first round before ending the fight in the third to capture his first professional title via knockout (KO). 

The first defence of his newly won WBO regional title was scheduled to take place on 29 July 2017 against Robert Swierzbinski at the SSE Arena in Belfast, as part of the undercard for Carl Frampton vs. Andrés Gutiérrez. However, Gutiérrez withdrew from the contest on 28 July after he slipped in the bath and suffered facial injuries, resulting in the cancellation of the entire event. Following the cancellation the WBO stripped Cummings of his European title for failing defend it.

Cummings vs. Luke Keeler 
Following the cancellation and subsequent loss of his title, Cummings scored two wins in six-round bouts – Norbert Szekeres by PTS in December and Michael Mora by technical knockout (TKO) in February 2018 – before getting the chance to regain the vacant WBO European title against Luke Keeler. The bout took place on 21 April 2018 at the SSE Arena in Belfast as part of the undercard for Carl Frampton vs. Nonito Donaire. Cummings suffered the second defeat of his professional career, losing by unanimous decision (UD) with the judges' scorecards reading 97–93, 98–92, and 99–91.

Regaining the WBO European title 
He bounced back from defeat with two wins in six-round bouts – Nicky Jenman by PTS in August and Jan Balog by TKO in October – before challenging for the vacant WBO European title for the third time in his career. Keeler was scheduled to defend the title against Brian Rose but was forced to pull out of the bout and vacate the title due to a back injury, resulting in Cummings stepping in as a replacement for the vacant title with the bout being scheduled for 7 December at the Titanic Exhibition Centre in Belfast. Rose was forced to withdraw from the bout after suffering a shoulder injury in an interim fight one month prior and was replaced by Ferenc Berki. Cummings regained the WBO European title via UD, with the judges' scorecards reading 99–90, 98–92, and 95–94.

Cummings vs. Luke Keeler II 
His first defence came in a rematch with Keeler, taking place on 29 March 2019 at the Ulster Hall in Belfast. After suffering a cut to his left eye in the third round, Cummings went on to lose by a wide-margin UD with one judge scoring the bout 99–91 and the other two scoring it 98–92.

Fourth WBO European title shot 
Following his third professional defeat, Cummings bounced back with a six-round PTS victory against Adam Grabiec in October. After Keeler vacated the WBO European title in pursuit of a world title shot, Cummings secures a fourth attempt at the vacant title, this time against Danny Dignum on 9 November 2019 at the York Hall. In a fight which saw Cummings receive a point deduction in the second round for repeated use of the elbow and suffer a cut in the fourth from an accidental clash of heads, he went on to suffer the fourth defeat of his career, the first by stoppage, losing via fifth-round TKO after Dignum landed a solid left hook which left Cummings on unsteady legs, prompting referee Howard Foster to step in and cal a halt to the contest.

Professional boxing record

References

Living people
Year of birth missing (living people)
Date of birth missing (living people)
Male boxers from Northern Ireland
Middleweight boxers